Scholar's Institute of Technology & Management is a technology and management institute located in Garchuk, Guwahati, Assam, India, and is promoted by the Scholar's Academy Education Trust, founded on 8 May 2008 under the Indian Trusts Act, 1882.

Campus 
The institute is in Garchuk in the Guwahati city. The campus is surrounded by hills and is spread over a lush green expanse of more than 10 acres.

The institute is easily accessible from the Guwahati city. The institute is 22 km from Guwahati railway station; 18 km from Lokpriya Gopinath Bordoloi International Airport; 14 km from Kamakhya Junction railway station; and 5.7 km from Rupnath Brahma Inter-State Bus Terminus, Guwahati.

Controversy 
In 2017, a fourth-semester civil engineering student of the Scholar's Institute of Technology and Management died following a fight with his classmates at the institute's hostel. Both the accused and the victim hail from Arunachal Pradesh. Both of them were in drunken state and were involved in a spat and later went on to the extent of exchanging blows resulting in victim's death.

Coinciding with the Statehood Day of Arunachal Pradesh, celebrations were held in the institute too by a section of the hostel boarders. According to sources, liquor in huge quantity was made available in the celebrations that led to the appalling incident.

Departments 
 Mechanical Engineering
 Electrical & Electronic Engineering
 Electronics and Communication Engineering
 Computer Science Engineering

See also 
 List of educational institutions in Guwahati

References 

Education in Guwahati